"One Word" is a 2005 song by Kelly Osbourne

One Word may also refer to:

 "One Word" (Baby Animals song), 1992
 "One Word" (Elliott Yamin song), 2007
 "One Word", a 1982 song by Anya Major
 "One Word", by The Grass Roots, from the 1972 album Move Along

See also 
 Oneword, a British radio station